Gozdanin may refer to the following places in Poland:
Gozdanin, Lower Silesian Voivodeship (south-west Poland)
Gozdanin, Kuyavian-Pomeranian Voivodeship (north-central Poland)